TD Daily is an American football magazine.  It was launched in 2012 as the football equivalent of the basketball magazine, SLAM. It covers and observes football "at all levels and through all lenses, including NFL NCAA, high school, fantasy, gear and more."

References

External links
TD Daily

2012 establishments in New York (state)
Magazines established in 2012
Magazines published in New York City
Sports magazines published in the United States